is a Japanese management and entertainment company, established in May 2019 as a joint venture between South Korean CJ ENM and Japanese Yoshimoto Kogyo. The company operates as a talent agency, entertainment company, and record label under Yoshimoto Music. It currently manages the winning groups of Produce 101 Japan, JO1 and INI, as well as trains several former trainees from the show under the program Lapone Boys & Girls.

History 
Lapone Entertainment was founded on May 29, 2019, as a joint venture between the South Korean company CJ ENM and the Japanese company Yoshimoto Kogyo, to organize and manage the winning group of the audition program Produce 101 Japan, which was co-produced by the two companies and MCIP Holdings. CJ ENM invested 11.5 billion won (US$9.6 million as of 2019) into the company, while Yoshimoto Kogyo invested 5 billion won (US$4.2 million as of 2019), splitting their shares 7:3. The name "Lapone" is derived from Yoshimoto Kogyo's slogan "laugh and peace" and CJ ENM's "only one". Choi Shin-hwa, former head of Yoshimoto Korea, was appointed as the CEO, while Jang Hyuk-jin from CJ ENM Japan was appointed as the COO. The company specializes in the planning, production, distribution, and sale of various videos and recordings of their artists. They also handle contracting and copyright business related to broadcasting programs, such as television or radio appearances and commercials. Lapone Entertainment also provides a training system where their artists routinely learn singing, dancing, lyrics writing, and composing, as well as receive language lessons between Korean, Chinese, or English. The company makes use of resources from both CJ ENM and Yoshimoto Kogyo to operate. Yoshimoto Kogyo handles the day-to-day management, such as local broadcast recruitment and schedule coordination, while CJ ENM handles the training and music production, though it is not limited to South Korean or Japanese producers only.

On March 4, 2020, the company debuted its first group JO1, which formed through Produce 101 Japan. In 2021, the show was renewed for a second season, which led to the creation of the second boy group INI. In June 2021, Yoshimoto Music announced the formation of a joint venture with Universal Music Japan, causing the company's releases, including Lapone Entertainment which operates under it as a label, to be distributed by Universal Music Japan. However, releases by JO1 are still distributed by Sony Music Solutions. In December, Lapone Entertainment introduced and opened recruitment for the trainee program, Lapone Boys & Lapone Girls, which included former contestants of Produce 101 Japan Season 2, Ayuta Fukuda, Ken Hiramoto, Koshin Terao, and Nalu Okubo.

On January 1, 2023, Lapone Entertainment opened official Twitter and YouTube accounts which feature collaboration projects between its groups. On February 13, the company announced to debut the six-piece boy band DXTeen on May 10th.

Artists

Groups
 JO1
 INI
 DXTeen

Notable trainees
 Lapone Boys

References

External links
 

J-pop
Japanese record labels
Japanese talent agencies
Entertainment companies of Japan
Entertainment companies established in 2019
Record labels established in 2019
Talent agencies based in Tokyo
Japanese companies established in 2019